Trichaeta teneiformis is a moth in the subfamily Arctiinae. It was described by Francis Walker in 1856. It is found in India (Himachal Pradesh) and Bhutan.

References

Moths described in 1856
Arctiinae